Byron D. Sher (born February 7, 1928) is an American Democratic politician. He served in the California State Senate from 1996 to 2004, prior to which, he served in the California State Assembly between 1980 and 1996. Sher was also a longtime professor at Stanford Law School. He served as the California Senate Rules Committee appointee to the Tahoe Regional Planning Agency from 2009 to 2012.

Early life and education
Sher was born February 7, 1928, in St. Louis, Missouri). He received his BA from Washington University in St. Louis and his JD from Harvard Law School. Before beginning his political career, Sher taught at several schools, including Harvard Law School, Southern Methodist University, the University of Southern California, and Stanford University. He also became a Fulbright research scholar.

Pre Assembly political career
Sher served on the Palo Alto City Council from 1965 to 1967 and from 1973 to 1980. He served as mayor in 1975 and 1978.

Legislative accomplishments
Sher was a major environmental proponent during his time in the legislature. Major legislative accomplishments of his include the Groundwater Protection Act (1983), California Clean Air Act (1988), and the California Safe Drinking Water Act (1989). He was the chairman of the Natural Resources Committee for 11 years.

He authored a bill, signed by Jerry Brown, that increased the statute of limitations for rape from three years to six in response to the fact that many serial rapists—such as Melvin Carter—were able to avoid or partially avoid prosecution due to the shorter limit expiring.

Personal
Near the end of his legislative career, the San Mateo County Board of Supervisors designated January 30, 2004, as Byron Sher Day, calling him "the most effective environmental legislator in the state." Sher was married to Linda B. Sher (1932–2014) and they have three children and five grandchildren. They lived together in Palo Alto, California for many decades. He is professor emeritus at Stanford Law School.

References

External links
Join California Byron Sher

1928 births
Harvard Law School alumni
Democratic Party members of the California State Assembly
Democratic Party California state senators
Living people
21st-century American politicians
People from Palo Alto, California
Washington University in St. Louis alumni
Stanford Law School faculty
Southern Methodist University faculty